Gill Marcus (born 10 August 1949) is a South African banker and politician who served as Governor of the South African Reserve Bank from 2009 to 2014. She was the first and only woman and the ninth person to hold the position.

Life and career

Early years

Marcus was born in Johannesburg, South Africa. Her grandparents were Jewish immigrants from Lithuania; both of her parents were born in South Africa.

Exile

Both her parents were anti-apartheid activists and members of the South African Communist Party (SACP). They went into exile in 1969, together with Gill, her two sisters and brother. She completed her degree by correspondence with the University of South Africa, with a BComm in Industrial Psychology in 1976. She joined the SACP and the African National Congress (ANC) in 1970 and began working for the exiled ANC's Department of Information and Publicity (DIP) in London, later becoming the DIP's deputy secretary.

Return

Marcus returned to South Africa in 1990 after the ANC was unbanned. She established the ANC's Information Department in 1990.

Politician and central banker

She was elected a Member of Parliament in 1994 and became Deputy Minister of Finance in the Government of National Unity of Nelson Mandela from 1996 to 1999, serving under Trevor Manuel. In 1999 she became Deputy Governor of the Reserve Bank under Tito Mboweni. She held the post for five years but left due to a personality clash with Mboweni.

She then held the Professorship of Leadership and Gender Studies at the Gordon Institute of Business Science, before going into business, initially as chairman of Western Areas mining company and later as non-executive director of Gold Fields. In 2007 she succeeded Danie Cronjé as chair of Absa Group and Absa Bank.

In July 2009, President Jacob Zuma announced that she would return to the Reserve Bank to succeed Mboweni as Governor. The appointment was welcomed by both economists and trade unionists.

She stepped down at the end of her five-year term in November 2014.

References

1949 births
Living people
African National Congress politicians
Academic staff of Gordon Institute of Business Science
Government ministers of South Africa
Governors of the South African Reserve Bank
Jewish socialists
Jewish South African anti-apartheid activists
Jewish South African politicians
Members of the National Assembly of South Africa
Members of the African National Congress
Members of the South African Communist Party
South African Communist Party politicians
20th-century South African economists
South African people of Lithuanian-Jewish descent
South African women activists
South African women economists
White South African anti-apartheid activists
21st-century South African economists